Mickleham may refer to:
 Mickleham, Victoria, Australia
 Mickleham, Surrey, England